Kari Wærness (born 13 January 1939) is a Norwegian sociologist. Her research has focused on women and gender studies, family and caring.

Early and personal life
Wærness was born in Leknes to Einar Loe and Aslaug Marie Eidsvåg. She married physician Endre Wærness in 1962.

Career
Wærness graduated as cand.mag. in 1962 from the University of Bergen. Along with her husband she settled in Mosjøen, where she worked as teacher in mathematics in secondary school until 1967. Back in Bergen, she started studying sociology and political science, and graduated as cand.polit. in 1972. From 1974 she was appointed at the Institute for Sociology at the University of Bergen, from 1987 as professor.

She was decorated Knight, First Class of the Order of St. Olav in 2017.

Select works

References

External links

1939 births
Living people
People from Vestvågøy
Norwegian sociologists
University of Bergen alumni
Academic staff of the University of Bergen
Norwegian Association for Women's Rights people